Robinsonia suffusa is a moth in the family Erebidae. It was described by Walter Rothschild in 1909. It is found in the upper Amazon region.

References

Moths described in 1909
Robinsonia (moth)